Succisa is a genus of flowering plants in the family Caprifoliaceae.

Species include the devil's-bit scabious, Succisa pratensis.

Species
, Plants of the World Online accepted three species:
Succisa pinnatifida Lange
Succisa pratensis Moench
Succisa trichotocephala Baksay

References

 
Caprifoliaceae genera